Marilee Jones (born June 12, 1951) is a former dean of admissions at the Massachusetts Institute of Technology (MIT) and the co-author of the popular guide to the college admission process Less Stress, More Success: A New Approach to Guiding Your Teen Through College Admissions and Beyond (American Academy of Pediatrics, 2006). The book received critical acclaim and Jones was featured on CBS, National Public Radio, USA Today, The New York Times, The Wall Street Journal, and The Boston Globe. 

Jones was first hired by MIT as an entry-level admissions officer in 1979; she was later promoted to associate director of admissions. She then served as interim dean of admissions from May 1997 until January 1998, when she was appointed to the position full-time.

Jones resigned from her position in 2007 after it was revealed that she had fabricated her academic degrees from Union College and Rensselaer Polytechnic Institute on a job application in 1979 and she had added a fabricated degree to her resume from Albany Medical College sometime "after she was hired." The Times characterized Jones's earlier prestige as "the guru of the movement to tame the college-admissions frenzy." The Boston Globe called her "the most celebrated and outspoken admissions dean in America."  After her resignation, she became the number 2 newsmaker of the day on COUNTDOWN with Keith Olbermann for "begging college applicants not to pad their resumes" while having done so herself.

Resignation
On April 23, 2007, Jones resigned her position after MIT learned she had fabricated her academic degrees from Union College and Rensselaer Polytechnic Institute when she first applied for an entry-level admissions officer position with MIT in 1979 and she had fabricated "a degree" from Albany Medical College "after she was hired." MIT administrators were alerted to the discrepancy on or around April 16, 2007. MIT has not released the name of the person or persons who alerted them about Jones's background. Jones issued a statement on the MIT web site, in which she admitted to wrongdoing: 

A spokesperson from Rensselaer Polytechnic Institute reported on April 26, 2007, that Jones attended the institute as a "part-time, non-matriculating student" from September 1974 to June 1975 and did not receive a degree.
Spokespeople from Union College and from Albany Medical College both reported that there are no records of Jones ever attending either institution. On May 2, 2007, it was reported that she had actually earned a bachelor's degree in biology from The College of Saint Rose in 1973, though she did not list that degree when applying for her first job at MIT or when being considered for subsequent promotions.

When Jones was appointed to the position of Dean of Admissions in 1998, she was credited with having earned an "SB and an SM in biology from Rennselaer Polytechnic Institute" in an article published in The Tech as well as an article published by MIT Tech Talk.  Neither article made any mention of the degree from Union College which she had placed on her resume in 1979 nor of a Ph.D. credited to her several times in 2007.  Shortly before her resignation, she was referred to by the title "Dr. Marilee Jones" in a number of forums.  A biography of her on the website for the 2007 September Conference of the National Association of College Admission Counselors referred to her as "Dr. Marilee Jones, Ph.D." and credited her with degrees from RPI and Albany Medical in biology and chemistry but offered no further details.  She was also referred to as "Dr. Marilee Jones" in the local Concord press in April 2007.  A February 2007 NPR transcript from All Things Considered referred to her as "Dr. Marilee Jones" (though the audio program itself did not address her as "Dr").  And a brief bio of her for an April 17, 2007 speaking engagement at Kean University's Annual School Counselor Conference referred to her as "Dr. Marilee Jones."  When asked in a December 6, 2009 interview with the Chronicle of Higher Education about having added "a degree" from Albany Medical to her resume "after she was hired" by MIT, Jones did not dispute the fact.  She could not, however, remember the details.

After her departure from MIT Jones created her own consulting firm which provides college admissions advice to both institutions and applicants. She also claimed she was offered the position of Dean of Admissions at several universities, which she declined.

In 2008, she hired Rose Marie Terenzio, a public relations consultant who was the former personal assistant of John F. Kennedy Jr, to help her make a "reclamation", a "comeback".

Awards
In 2001, Jones received MIT's Excellence Award for Leading Change, which recognized Jones's leadership as dean of admissions. An excerpt from the presentation reads: 

Jones also received MIT's Gordon Y. Billard Award "for special service of outstanding merit performed for the Institute" in 2006.

Personal
Jones is divorced from Steven R. Bussolari, an engineer at MIT's Lincoln Laboratory. They have one daughter.

While still holding the position of dean of admissions at MIT, Jones delivered a speech at his daughter's 2006 commencement from Middlesex School, advising the graduates to "create your own reality" and "give out what you want to get back".

References

1951 births
Living people
Massachusetts Institute of Technology people
College of Saint Rose alumni
American instructional writers
Writers from Massachusetts
Writers from Albany, New York
Academic scandals
American university and college faculty deans
Women deans (academic)
People who fabricated academic degrees